The Gulf South Conference women's basketball tournament is the annual conference women's basketball championship tournament for the Gulf South Conference. The tournament has been held annually since 1983, except for a two-year hiatus during 1990 and 1991. It is a single-elimination tournament and seeding is based on regular season records.

The winner receives the Gulf South's automatic bid to the NCAA Division II women's basketball tournament.

Results

Championship records

 Auburn–Montgomery, Christian Brothers, and Montevallo have not yet qualified for the tournament finals.
 Harding, Mississippi Women, Ouachita Baptist, Shorter, Southern Arkansas, Tennessee–Martin, and Troy never reached the tournament finals before departing the Gulf South.
 Schools highlighted in pink are former members of the Gulf South Conference

See also
Gulf South Conference men's basketball tournament
NCAA Division II women's basketball tournament

References

NCAA Division II women's basketball conference tournaments
Tournament
Recurring sporting events established in 1981